Sun Goddess is a jazz album by Ramsey Lewis, released on Columbia Records in 1974. The album reached No. 1 on the Billboard Top Soul Albums chart and No. 12 on the Billboard Top Pop Albums chart. Sun Goddess was also certified Gold in the US by the RIAA.

About the album
After his classic acoustic albums in the 1960s, Ramsey Lewis wanted to head in a new musical direction in the 1970s. As the mid-70s approached, he reunited with Maurice White, who at that time was with his own band, Earth, Wind & Fire. Members of EW&F including White played on the album sessions, while Philip Bailey added vocals.

The album became a crossover hit, charting at No. 1 on the Billboard R&B and jazz album charts, while peaking at No. 12 on the pop album chart. The tracks, "Hot Dawgit" and "Sun Goddess", charted on the R&B, pop and disco singles charts. Sun Goddess was certified gold by the RIAA.

For years, the identity of the woman on the album cover, photographed by Herb Breuer, had been a mystery among fans, as there was no credit on the album cover. Lewis revealed on his Facebook page in June 2011 that the model was Susan Leigh Scott, now Susan Maxon. Maxon had moved to Seattle, where Lewis was performing during his 2011 Sun Goddess Tour, and decided to attend one of his performances. A photo was taken of the backstage meeting between Lewis and Maxon, which Lewis posted on his page.

Track listing

Personnel

Philip Bailey - Conga, vocals
Cleveland Eaton - Bass, bass guitar
Johnny Graham - Guitar
Byron Gregory - Guitar
Maurice Jennings - percussion, conga, drums, tambourine
Ramsey Lewis - Synthesizer, guitar, piano, electric guitar, electric piano, Fender Rhodes, Wurlitzer, string machine
Don Myrick - Tenor Saxophone
Derf Reklaw-Raheem - Conga, drums, vocals
Charles Stepney - Guitar, electric guitar, Fender Rhodes
Maurice White - Drums, timbales, vocals
Verdine White - Bass, vocals
Technical
Dave Antler - Engineer
Richard Evans - Horn arrangements, string arrangements

Charts

Weekly charts

Year-end charts

Singles

See also
List of number-one R&B albums of 1975 (U.S.)

References

1974 albums
Ramsey Lewis albums
Jazz-funk albums
Albums produced by Teo Macero
Albums produced by Maurice White
Columbia Records albums